In enzymology, a sinapate 1-glucosyltransferase is an enzyme that catalyzes the chemical reaction:

UDP-glucose + sinapate  UDP + 1-sinapoyl-D-glucose

Thus, the two substrates of this enzyme are UDP-glucose and sinapate, whereas its two products are UDP and 1-sinapoyl-D-glucose.

This enzyme belongs to the family of glycosyltransferases, specifically the hexosyltransferases.  The systematic name of this enzyme class is UDP-glucose:sinapate D-glucosyltransferase. Other names in common use include uridine diphosphoglucose-sinapate glucosyltransferase, UDP-glucose:sinapic acid glucosyltransferase, uridine 5'-diphosphoglucose-hydroxycinnamic acid, and acylglucosyltransferase.  This enzyme participates in phenylpropanoid biosynthesis.

References 

 

EC 2.4.1
Enzymes of unknown structure
Hydroxycinnamic acids metabolism